Conjugal Rites is a British television sitcom which aired on ITV in two series between 16 April 1993 and 17 June 1994. It is based on the 1991 play Conjugal Rites by Roger Hall, with Gwen Taylor reprising the role she had played on stage.

Main cast
 Gwen Taylor as  Gen Masefield
 Michael Williams as Barry Masefield
 Stephen Moyer as Philip Masefield
 Cordelia Bugeja as  Gillian Masefield
 Alan MacNaughtan as Jack
 Warren Clarke as  Toby

References

Bibliography
 Howard Maxford. Hammer Complete: The Films, the Personnel, the Company. McFarland, 2018.

External links
 

1993 British television series debuts
1994 British television series endings
1990s British comedy television series
ITV sitcoms
Television series by ITV Studios
Television shows produced by Granada Television
English-language television shows